The Viking Bridge, also known as Goose River Bridge, near Portland, North Dakota, was built in 1885 over the Goose River.  It was listed on the National Register of Historic Places in 1997.

The bridge is the oldest documented bridge in the state.  It is also historically significant "for its association with C.P. Jones, a nineteenth-century bridge fabricator important for introducing iron and steel bridge technologies to North Dakota."

References

Road bridges on the National Register of Historic Places in North Dakota
Bridges completed in 1885
Transportation in Traill County, North Dakota
National Register of Historic Places in Traill County, North Dakota
Pratt truss bridges in the United States
1885 establishments in Dakota Territory
Bridges over the Goose River (North Dakota)